Ch. Wycollar Boy was a Wire Fox Terrier who won best in show at the 1917 and 1920 Westminster Kennel Club Dog Show, in New York City. His owner was Mrs. Roy A. Rainey.

References

Best in Show winners of the Westminster Kennel Club Dog Show